Rita Moreno is a Puerto Rican actress, singer, and dancer. 

With a career spanning nearly 80 years in the entertainment industry, Moreno is one of a few individuals to have won the four major annual American entertainment awards: an Oscar, an Emmy, a Grammy, and a Tony. 

She is also one of the few performers who have achieved the "Triple Crown of Acting", with individual competitive Academy, Emmy, and Tony awards for acting; she, Helen Hayes, and Viola Davis are the only three who have achieved both distinctions in their lifetimes. She has won numerous other awards, including various lifetime achievement awards and the Presidential Medal of Freedom, America's highest civilian honor. In 2013, she received the Screen Actors Guild Life Achievement Award.On March 28, 2019 Moreno received a Peabody Award.

Major associations

Academy Awards
1 win out of 1 nomination

BAFTA Awards
1 nomination

Emmy Awards

Golden Globe Awards
1 win out of 3 nominations

Grammy Awards
1 win out of 2 nominations

Peabody Award
1 win out of 1 nomination

Screen Actors Guild Awards
1 win out of 1 nomination

Tony Awards
1 win out of 1 nomination

Other associations

ALMA Awards
4 wins out of 7 nominations

CableACE Awards
1 win out of 1 nomination

Critics' Choice Awards

Critics' Choice Television Awards

3 nominations

Critics' Choice Movie Awards
1 nomination

Drama Desk Awards
2 nominations

Imagen Foundation Awards
1 win out of 4 nominations

Laurel Awards
1 win out of 1 nomination

NAACP Image Awards
3 nominations

OFTA Awards
2 wins out of 8 nominations

Satellite Awards
1 nomination

London Film Critics' Circle 
1 nomination

References

Moreno, Rita